Paul Norman (October 1951 – 27 June 2004) was a British scientist who served as Chief Scientist for Detection and Protection at the Ministry of Defence's laboratory at Porton Down, Wiltshire.  He was also a member of the Royal Society. Norman was considered a pioneer against the use of biological weapons and chemical weapons.

Norman died on 27 June 2004 when the light aircraft he was piloting crashed in Devon. Two others died on the scene of the accident, one other member of the party died later in hospital. Norman is survived by his wife and two children. His death was declared accidental in August 2007

References

External links
BBC Report from 2004 on Dr Paul Norman's death

1951 births
2004 deaths
Victims of aviation accidents or incidents in the United Kingdom
Accidental deaths in England